Dongan-gu is a district of the city of Anyang in Gyeonggi-do, South Korea.

Administrative divisions
Dongan-gu is divided into the following "dong"s.
Bisan-dong (Divided in turn into Bisan 1 to 3 Dong, Buheung-dong and Daran-dong)
Gwanyang-dong (Divided in turn into Gwanyang 1 and 2 Dong and Burim-dong)
Pyeongchon-dong (Divided in turn into Pyeongchon-dong, Pyeongan-dong and Gwiin-dong)
Hogye-dong (Divided in turn into Hogye 1 to 3 Dong, Beomgye-dong, Sinchon-dong and Galsan-dong)

See also
Anyang, Gyeonggi
Manan-gu

 
Anyang, Gyeonggi
Districts in Gyeonggi Province